The Chamek railway station was a Malaysian train station located at and named after the town of Chamek, Kluang District, Johor. When it was opened, the station was located on a curved track alignment with two extra lines running in parallel to possibly allow for more railway operations when the main line is getting occupied by a train stopping at the station.

Closure
Chamek station closed on 7 September, 2020 when the station was not selected for rebuilding as part of the Gemas-Johor Bahru double-tracking and electrification project.

See also
 Rail transport in Malaysia

History of Johor
Kluang District
Defunct railway stations in Malaysia
Railway stations in Johor